The men's 100m breaststroke SB5 event at the 2008 Summer Paralympics took place at the Beijing National Aquatics Center on 12 September. There were two heats; the swimmers with the eight fastest times advanced to the final.

Results

Heats
Competed from 10:18.

Heat 1

Heat 2

Final
Competed at 18:42.

 
Q = qualified for final.

References
 
 

Swimming at the 2008 Summer Paralympics